The 61st Victorian state election is expected to be held on 28 November 2026 to elect the 61st Parliament of Victoria. All 88 seats in the Legislative Assembly (lower house) and all 40 seats in the Legislative Council (upper house) will be up for election, presuming there are no new electorates added in a redistribution.

The election will be administered by the Victorian Electoral Commission.

Background

Previous election and parliament

The Daniel Andrews led Labor government was returned to power in 2014 after winning a majority of seats in the Legislative Assembly at the 2014 state election. The Labor party was re-elected at the 2018 state election and again at the 2022 state election, winning 56 seats. The Liberal/National Coalition gained one seat to 28 seats, the Greens won 4 seats. In the Legislative Council, the Labor party won 15 of the 40 seats.

Daniel Andrews and the Labor government are expected to be seeking a fourth four-year term, assuming he is not handing power to the deputy premier, Jacinta Allan. Opposition Leader Matthew Guy stood down as Liberal leader a day after the party's poor result at the 2022 election, with John Pesutto elected as the new leader after an ensuing leadership spill.

Electoral system 
Eligible Victorian electors are required to cast a ballot due to compulsory voting laws. The eligibility criteria for enrolment to vote includes being 18 years or older, an Australian citizen, and to have lived in Victoria for longer than a month.

Legislative Assembly 

For the election of members to single seats of the Legislative Assembly, the Victorian Electoral Commission (VEC) uses full preferential voting where for a vote to count, it is required to number every box on the ballot in the order of the most preferred candidate for the particular electoral district an elector is registered to vote in. The election will cover all 88 Seats of the Victorian Legislative Assembly.

Legislative Council 

For the election of members to multi-member state regions in the Legislative Council the VEC uses optional preferential voting where voters can either vote for a political party or a group voting ticket 'above the line' or vote for individual candidates 'below the line'. 
Members of the Legislative Council represent state regions. There are currently eight state regions, they make up of eleven Legislative Assembly districts and are each represented by five members of Parliament in the Legislative Council.

When voting 'above the line', for a vote to count, voters are required to write the number 1 for the political party or group of candidates they prefer. Preferences will then be automatically distributed based on the registered preference order provided to the VEC by the group voting ticket.

When voting 'below the line', for a vote to count, voters are required to number a minimum of 5 boxes on the ballot in the order of their most preferred candidate.

Date 
In accordance to the timetable set out in the Electoral Act 2002 (VIC), the terms of elected officials to Victorian Parliament are on a fixed term basis. All elections since the 2006 have occurred every four years on the last Saturday of November. Unless the Governor of Victoria unexpectedly dissolves parliament, the election is expected to be held on 28 November 2026.

Expected timeline of the election 
 3 November 2026: The Legislative Assembly expires prompting the need for an election to be held. This also means that there are no longer any members, business of parliament ends until a new parliament is formed, and parliament enters into a caretaker period.
 3 November 2026: On the same day that the Legislative Assembly expires, the Governor of Victoria issues a writ for the VEC to hold an election.
 10 November 2026: 7 days after the writ is issued, at 8:00 pm, the electoral roll is closed meaning people can no longer be added to the electoral roll, update the electorate they live in, or update any other information.
 13 November 2026: 10 days after the writ is issued, at noon, the period for submitting candidate nominations closes.
 28 November 2026: The last Saturday of November, nearest to the fourth year following of the previous election date, is the Election Day.
 19 December 2026: Within 21 days following election day, the Electoral Commissioner returns the writ with information regarding the successful candidates.

Pre-electoral pendulum

Opinion polling

Graphical summary

Voting intention

Preferred Premier and satisfaction

Notes

References

External links
Victorian Electoral Commission Homepage

Elections in Victoria (Australia)
2026 elections in Australia
2020s in Victoria (Australia)
November 2026 events in Australia